The Masonic Hall is a historic building on Duncombe Place in York, in England.

The building was designed by J. Barton-Wilson and John Edwin Gates and was completed in 1863.  It was altered in 1866, and a large extension was added in the early 20th century.  It is of two storeys, with a basement beneath.  The original building, including the masonic hall itself, is of grey brick, while the extension is red brick.  The entrance is now through the extension.  The front has a moulding depicting masonic symbols.  The library has 18th century panelling and a fireplace of similar date.

The hall is home to several masonic lodges, including the York Lodge, founded as the Union Lodge in 1777.  From 1806, the lodge was based at 7 Little Blake Street, but that property was demolished when Duncombe Place was constructed, and the current hall was then built.  The building is the oldest purpose-built masonic hall in the city.

The building was grade II listed in 1997.

References

Buildings and structures completed in 1863
Grade II listed buildings in York
Masonic buildings in the United Kingdom
Duncombe Place